Wang Xihou (1713–1777), courtesy name Hanbo, was a Chinese scholar from Xinchang County (modern-day Yifeng County, Jiangxi) who lived during the Qing dynasty. He was executed under the Qing government's literary inquisition policies during the reign of the Qianlong Emperor.

Wang was born in 1713. At the age of five, he began his studies with his brother Wang Jingyun, and became proficient at the exegesis of ancient Chinese texts by age eight. He locked himself in a room, studying day and night, and was sent home-cooked meals through a small crevice.

Wang became a scholar-bureaucrat at age 38. He wrote a book called Zi Guan, which criticized the Kangxi Dictionary and printed the Kangxi Emperor's name without leaving out a stroke as required by Chinese naming taboo. When the Qianlong Emperor found out about this in 1777, Wang was imprisoned in Beijing and sentenced to nine familial exterminations, the most serious form of capital punishment in imperial China. However, as was usual in such cases with literary inquisition, the Emperor commuted the sentence by pardoning all Wang Xihou's relatives and his grandsons given only a procedural sentence of execution at the autumn assizes (qiushen 秋審) during which the case would be reviewed and usually spared the death penalty. Wang Xihou's sentence was commuted from death by 1000 cuts to only death by beheading.

References 

1713 births
1777 deaths
Qing dynasty writers
People executed by the Qing dynasty by decapitation
Executed Qing dynasty people
Executed Chinese people
People from Yichun, Jiangxi
Writers from Jiangxi
Executed people from Jiangxi
18th-century executions
18th-century Chinese writers